Nusrat railway station may refer to the following stations:

Nusrat railway station (Pakistan)
Nusrat railway station (Turkey)